McDuff (also spelled Macduff) is a surname.  It is the Anglicized form of the Scottish Gaelic name Mac Dhuibh (Mac = son, Dhuibh = dark/black). Notable people with the surname include:

Caleb McDuff (born 2008), Welsh deaf racing driver
David McDuff (born 1945), Scottish literary translator
Dusa McDuff (born 1945), English mathematician
Jack McDuff (1926–2001), American jazz musician
Kenneth McDuff (1946–1998), American serial killer

Fictional characters:
McDuff, the Talking Dog, a children's television character
Suds McDuff, another name for The Simpsons''' dog Santa's Little Helper
Father Cyril McDuff, a priest in the television series Father Ted''

See also 
McDuff, a neighbourhood in East Wemyss, Fife, Scotland 
Gritty McDuff's Brewing Company, a brewery in Maine, USA
McDuff Electronics, a defunct subsidiary of Tandy Corporation
Macduff (disambiguation)
Clan MacDuff
Duff (disambiguation)
Duff (surname)
Dove (surname)

Surnames of Scottish origin
Anglicised Scottish Gaelic-language surnames